This is the electoral history of Mitt Romney, the 70th Governor of Massachusetts (2003–2007) and the incumbent United States Senator from Utah. Romney ran for president in the 2008 and 2012 presidential primaries. In 2018, Romney declared his candidacy for the United States Senate in the state of Utah and on November 6 was declared the winner.

U.S. Senate election in Massachusetts

1994

Gubernatorial election

2002

Presidential elections

2008

2012

U.S. Senate election in Utah

2018

See also
 Mitt Romney 2008 presidential campaign
 Mitt Romney 2012 presidential campaign

References

Mitt Romney
Romney, Mitt